NASA Astronaut Group 17, were chosen by NASA in 1998 and announced on June 4 of that year. The group of 32 candidates included eight pilots, 17 mission specialists, and seven international mission specialists who became NASA astronauts. They began training in August 1998.

Pilots

Lee Archambault (2 flights)
Pilot, STS-117 (Atlantis)
Commander, STS-119 (Discovery)
Christopher Ferguson (3 flights)
Pilot, STS-115 (Atlantis)
Commander, STS-126 (Endeavour)
Commander, STS-135 (Atlantis)
Kenneth Ham (2 flights)
Pilot, STS-124 (Discovery)
Commander, STS-132 (Atlantis)
Gregory C. Johnson (1 flight)
Pilot, STS-125
Gregory H. Johnson (2 flights)
Pilot, STS-123, (Endeavour)
Pilot, STS-134, (Endeavour)
William Oefelein (dismissed from the NASA astronaut corps and reassigned to the U.S. Navy, later retiring from military service) (1 flight)
Pilot, STS-116, (Discovery)
Alan Poindexter (2 flights)
Pilot, STS-122, (Atlantis)
Commander, STS-131 (Discovery)
George Zamka (2 flights)
Pilot, STS-120, (Discovery)
Commander, STS-130, (Endeavour)

Mission specialists
Clayton Anderson (2 flights)
STS-117 (Atlantis); launched to the ISS
Flight engineer, Expedition 15
STS-120 (Discovery; landed from ISS)
STS-131 (Discovery)
Tracy Caldwell (2 flights)
STS-118 (Endeavour)
Soyuz TMA-18
Flight engineer, Expedition 23/Expedition 24
Gregory Chamitoff (2 flights)
NEEMO 3
Mission Specialist, STS-124 (Discovery; launched to ISS)
Flight engineer, Expedition 17/Expedition 18 (also served as a science officer)
Mission Specialist, STS-126 (Endeavour; landed from ISS)
Mission Specialist, STS-134 (Endeavour)
Timothy Creamer (1 flight)
Soyuz TMA-17
Flight engineer, Expedition 22/Expedition 23
Michael Foreman (2 flights)
Mission specialist, STS-123 (Endeavour)
Mission specialist, STS-129 (Atlantis)
Michael Fossum (3 flights)
Mission specialist, STS-121 (Discovery)
Mission specialist, STS-124 (Discovery)
Soyuz TMA-02M
Flight engineer, Expedition 28
Commander, Expedition 29
Stanley G. Love (1 flight)
Mission specialist, STS-122 (Atlantis)
Leland Melvin (2 flights)
Mission specialist, STS-122 (Atlantis)
Mission specialist, STS-129 (Atlantis)
Barbara Morgan (1 flight)
STS-118 (Endeavour)
John Olivas (2 flights)
Mission specialist, STS-117 (Atlantis)
Mission specialist, STS-128 (Discovery)
Nicholas Patrick (2 flights)
Mission specialist, STS-116 (Discovery)
Mission specialist, STS-130 (Endeavour)
Garrett Reisman (2 flights)
STS-123 (Endeavour; launched to ISS)
Flight engineer, Expedition 16/Expedition 17
STS-124 (Discovery; landed from ISS)
STS-132 (Atlantis)
Patricia Robertson
Steven Swanson (3 flights)
Mission specialist, STS-117 (Atlantis)
Mission specialist, STS-119 (Discovery)
Soyuz TMA-12M
Flight engineer, Expedition 39
Commander, Expedition 40
Douglas H. Wheelock (2 flights)
Mission specialist, STS-120 (Discovery)
Soyuz TMA-19
Flight engineer, Expedition 24
Commander, Expedition 25
Sunita Williams (2 flights)
STS-116 (Discovery; launched to ISS)
Flight engineer, Expedition 14/Expedition 15
STS-117 (Atlantis; landed from ISS)
Soyuz TMA-05M
Flight engineer, Expedition 32
Commander, Expedition 33
Future flight Pilot, Boeing CFT (Calypso)
Neil Woodward

International mission specialists
Léopold Eyharts, France (2 flights)
Soyuz TM-27 (to Mir; launched only)
Soyuz TM-26 (from Mir; landed only)
STS-122 (Atlantis – to International Space Station (ISS); launched only)
Flight Engineer, Expedition 16
STS-123 (Endeavour – from ISS; landed only)
Paolo Nespoli, Italy (3 flights)
STS-120 (Discovery – ISS mission)
 Soyuz TMA-20
 Expedition 26
 Expedition 27
Marcos Pontes, Brazil (1 flight) (first Brazilian in space)
Soyuz TMA-8 (launched only)
Soyuz TMA-7 (landed only)
Expedition 13, International Space Station (9 days only)
Hans Schlegel, Germany (2 flights)
Payload Specialist, STS-55 (Columbia – Spacelab)
Mission Specialist, STS-122 (Atlantis – to ISS)
Robert Thirsk, Canada (2 flights)
Payload Specialist, STS-78 (Columbia; Spacelab)
Soyuz TMA-15
Expedition 20
Bjarni Tryggvason, Canada (1 flight)
Payload Specialist, STS-85 (Discovery)
Roberto Vittori (Italy) (3 flights)
Soyuz TM-34 (launched only)
Soyuz TM-33 (landed only)
Soyuz TMA-6 (launched only)
Expedition 11 (10 days only)
Soyuz TMA-5 (landed only)
Mission Specialist, STS-134 (Endeavour)

NASA biographies

See also
List of astronauts by selection

External links
Current astronauts page
Retired astronauts page
Foreign astronauts page
Payload specialist astronauts page

NASA Astronaut Corps
Lists of astronauts